Johann Caspar Horn or Kaspar (fl. 1640s) was a German composer, physician and musician. At Dresden he was connected with Heinrich Schütz.

Works, editions and recordings
 Geistliche Harmonien, Wintertheil (Dresden, 1680)
 Geistliche Harmonien, Sommertheil (Dresden, 1681)
 Parergon musicum, oder Musicalisches Neben-Werck (Leipzig. 1663-76)

References

17th-century German musicians
German Baroque composers
German classical composers
German male classical composers
Physicians from Leipzig
Pupils of Heinrich Schütz
17th-century male musicians